Varshavsky (masculine), Varshavskaya (feminine), or Varshavskoye (neuter) may refer to:

Varshavsky (surname)

Places
 Varshavsky Rail Terminal, a former rail terminal in St. Petersburg, Russia
 Varshavskaya (Moscow Metro), a station of the Moscow Metro, Russia
 Varshavskoye (MPD), a motion power depot of the Moscow Metro
 Varshavskoye Shosse, a highway in Moscow, Russia
 Warsaw Governorate (Varshavskaya Guberniya)